Z99 (99.9 FM) is a radio station in the Cayman Islands in the British West Indies. The station is owned by Compass Media. It airs a Contemporary Hit Radio music format. Compass Media was founded in 1965. 

Z99FM was the first commercial radio station in the Cayman Islands. It began broadcasting as ZFZZ, issued under the British call sign system, on May 23, 1992. The station's most recent license was issued on 11 December 2003

References

External links
Z99 official website
Compass Media

Radio stations in the Cayman Islands
Contemporary hit radio stations